The Australian Broadcasting Authority was an Australian government agency whose main roles were to regulate broadcasting, radio communications and telecommunications. The Authority took over the functions of the Australian Broadcasting Tribunal on 5 October 1992 as stipulated in the Broadcasting Services Act 1992.

The Australian Broadcasting Tribunal took over the functions of the Australian Broadcasting Control Board in the 1970s. The engineering function in some cases was handled by the National Transmission Authority when the Postmaster-General's Department ceased being responsible for telecommunications.

On 1 July 2005, the Australian Broadcasting Authority and the Australian Communications Authority were merged to form the Australian Communications and Media Authority.

See also
 Censorship in Australia

References

Broadcasting in Australia
1992 establishments in Australia
2005 disestablishments in Australia
Broadcasting authorities
Defunct Commonwealth Government agencies of Australia